James Morrison RSA RSW (11 April 1932 – 31 August 2020). Born in Glasgow, James "Jim” Morrison studied at the Glasgow School of Art from 1950 - 1954.
In 1957, along with Anda Paterson and James Spence, he founded the Glasgow Group of artists.

Morrison was an Academician of the Royal Scottish Academy and a member of the Royal Scottish Society of Painters in Watercolour.

In 1965, Morrison joined the staff at Duncan of Jordanstone College of Art, Dundee and settled in Montrose. He left the college in 1987 to paint full-time.

Whilst in Glasgow he painted several striking canvases of Glasgow tenements. Best known as a landscape painter, his main working areas were the lush farmland around his home in Angus and the rugged landscape of Assynt in Sutherland. He also undertook a number of painting expeditions outside Scotland to southern France, to the Arctic Circle, and the Limpopo region of Botswana.

The Royal family own several Morrison paintings, as does J. K. Rowling.

The hour-long documentary film, Eye of the Storm, directed Anthony W. J. Baxter (director of You’ve Been Trumped), was scheduled to be premiered at the 2021 Glasgow Film Festival. The film examines Morrison’s documentation of the impact climate change has on the Arctic, to where he travelled many times, and recounts his personal deep interest in the changing landscapes of his native Scotland, in the context of his progressive sight loss. On 4 April 2021 the film was broadcast by BBC Two.

External links

 Scottish Gallery website showing some of Morrison's work

References

1932 births
2020 deaths
20th-century Scottish painters
Scottish male painters
21st-century Scottish painters
21st-century Scottish male artists
Scottish watercolourists
Artists from Glasgow
Alumni of the Glasgow School of Art
Royal Scottish Academicians
20th-century Scottish male artists